Luis Alberto Meseguer Villanueva (born 7 September 1999), sometimes known as Mese, is a professional footballer who plays as a defender for AD Unión Adarve. Born in Spain, he represents the Equatorial Guinea national team. A left back, he can also operate as a centre back and a right back.

Club career
Meseguer spent most of his youth career in Atlético Madrid. After a year with Unión Adarve, he joined Rayo Vallecano. He made his senior debut with Rayo Vallecano B in 2018. He was an unused substitution for Rayo Vallecano against Leganés at Copa del Rey.

International career
Madrid-born Meseguer qualifies to play for Equatorial Guinea through his father. He made his international debut on 17 November 2018, in a 0–1 loss against Senegal during the 2019 Africa Cup of Nations qualifiers, being he who scored the own goal of the match.

International goals
Scores and results list Equatorial Guinea's goal tally first.

Notes

References

1999 births
Living people
Citizens of Equatorial Guinea through descent
Equatoguinean footballers
Association football fullbacks
Equatorial Guinea international footballers
Footballers from Madrid
Spanish footballers
Rayo Vallecano B players
Zamora CF footballers
Tercera División players
Segunda División B players
Spanish sportspeople of Equatoguinean descent
2021 Africa Cup of Nations players